Jameh Mosque of Shahrud is related to the Ilkhanate and is located in Shahrud.

References

Mosques in Iran
Mosque buildings with domes
National works of Iran
Shahrud